Andrew Mahar is a Supreme Court justice in the Northwest Territories. He was moved from Nunavut to NWT in May 2015.

References 

Living people
Judges in the Northwest Territories
Year of birth missing (living people)